Teresa Bugajczyk (born 3 November 1953) is a Polish luger. She competed in the women's singles event at the 1976 Winter Olympics.

References

1953 births
Living people
Polish female lugers
Olympic lugers of Poland
Lugers at the 1976 Winter Olympics
People from Jelenia Góra